Wooldridge v Sumner [1963] 2 QB 43 is an English Court of Appeal judgment dealing with the liability in negligence of participants in sporting competitions towards spectators. The Court of Appeal held in this case that sportsmen would only be liable to spectators if they showed "reckless disregard" for their safety.

Facts
The plaintiff, Mr Wooldridge, who was a photographer at a horse race, was injured by the horse belonging to the defendant, Sumner, which was ridden in a competition by Ron Holladay, who was a skilled and experienced horseman.

Judgment
The Court of Appeal held that Sumner owed no duty of care to Wooldridge in this case. As a spectator, Wooldridge accepted the risks involved in a horserace he came to watch. As a reasonable participant in the race, which is a fast and competitive sport, the horseman was expected to concentrate on the race and not on the spectator. In the course of a fast moving competition such as this one, he could be expected to make errors of judgment. As long as the damage was not caused recklessly or deliberately, the participant in a race could not be held liable for the spectators injuries because he was not negligent, i.e. not in breach of his duty.

See also
 Negligence
 English tort law
 Duty of care
 Breach of duty in English law
 Harrison v Vincent

Resolution

English tort case law
Court of Appeal (England and Wales) cases
1963 in case law
1963 in British law